In functional analysis, a total set (also called a complete set) in a vector space is a set of linear functionals  with the property that if a vector  satisfies  for all  then  is the zero vector.

See also

References

Linear algebra
Topological vector spaces